The 14th Army was an army level formation of the People's Liberation Army.

14th Corps
14th Corps was activated on February 14, 1949 basing on 4th Column of Zhongyuan Field Army and defecting Republic of China Army 110th Division. The corps commander was Li Chengfang, political commissar - Lei Rongtian.

The Corps was composed of the 40th, the 41st, and the 42nd Divisions.

During the Chinese Civil War, the corps took part in Guangdong Campaign and Xichang Campaign. From March 1950 the corps stationed in Yunnan province until its inactivation.

In 1959, elements from the corps took part in the crackdown on 1959 Tibetan uprising.

14th Army Corps
In April 1960, the corps was renamed as 14th Army Corps. By then the corps was composed of:
116th Artillery Regiment
39th Anti-Aircraft Artillery Regiment
40th Army Division
118th Infantry Regiment
119th Infantry Regiment
120th Infantry Regiment
320th Artillery Regiment
41st Army Division
121st Infantry Regiment
122nd Infantry Regiment
123rd Infantry Regiment
321st Artillery Regiment
42nd Army Division
124th Infantry Regiment
125th Infantry Regiment
126th Infantry Regiment
322nd Artillery Regiment

In late 1969, 116th Artillery Regiment and 39th Anti-Aircraft Artillery Regiment were renamed as Artillery Regiment, 14th Army Corps, and Anti-Aircraft Artillery Regiment, 14th Army Corps, respectively.

Shadian Incident
In July 1975, 14th Army Corps, especially its 42nd Army Division, took part in the crackdown on Shadian incident as the main assault force, during which the PLA killed over 1000 Hui Muslim fighters with a loss of over 120 KIA.

Known units/elements from 14th Army Corps took part in the incident:
124th Infantry Regiment, 42nd Army Division;
126th Infantry Regiment, 42nd Army Division;
Reconnaissance Company, 14th Army Corps;
Artillery Regiment, 14th Army Corps, which shelled the town of Shadian with 152 mm gun-howitzers;
Flamethrower Company, Engineer Battalion, 14th Army Corps.

Sino-Vietnamese War
From February to March 1979, the 14th Army Corps took part in the Sino-Vietnamese War. During the 25-day-long campaign, the army corps thrust 48-80 km into the Vietnamese territory, seized the city of Lào Cai and secured the bridgehead across the Red River.

In 1982, Tank Regiment, 14th Army Corps was activated.

In April 1984 the army corps launched the Battle of Laoshan and the Battle of Zheyinshan.

14th Army
In September 1985 the army corps was reorganized as 14th Army. The army was then composed of:
Communications Regiment
Engineer Regiment
31st Infantry Division - a southern motorized infantry division unit;
40th Infantry Division - a southern motorized infantry division unit;
41st Infantry Division - a southern infantry division, catalogue B unit;
42nd Infantry Division - a southern infantry division, catalogue B unit;
Tank Brigade - merged from Tank Regiment, 11th Army Corps and Tank Regiment, 14th Army Corps;
Anti-Aircraft Artillery Brigade

In September 1992 42nd Infantry Division was disbanded. 

In October 1996, 41st Infantry Division was transferred to People's Armed Police's control as 41st Armed Police Mobile Division.

In 1998, Tank Brigade, 14th Army was renamed as Armored Brigade, 14th Army.

In late 2011, Armored Brigade, 14th Army was redesignated as 18th Armored Brigade.

In late 2013, both the 31st Infantry Division and 40th Infantry Division were split into two brigades. The army became an "all-brigade" formation.

From 2014 to 2016, the army was composed of:
18th Armored Brigade
31st Mechanized Infantry Brigade
32nd Motorized Infantry Brigade
40th Motorized Infantry Brigade
42nd Mechanized Infantry Brigade
Artillery Brigade
Anti-Aircraft Brigade
11th Army Aviation Regiment
Communications Regiment
17th Engineer Regiment
NBC Defense Regiment
86th Pontoon Bridge Regiment.

In April 2017 the army was inactivated. Most of its compositions were inherited by 75th Army.

References 

14
Military units and formations established in 1949
Military units and formations disestablished in 2017